The Political Economy Club is the world's oldest economics association founded by James Mill and a circle of friends in 1821 in London, for the purpose of coming to an agreement on the fundamental principles of political economy.  David Ricardo, James Mill, Thomas Malthus (the only one holding an academic post at the time), and Robert Torrens were among the original luminaries.

In the early 19th century there were no academic societies or professional associations for economists.  The Political Economy Club was a way to establish a scientific community, test ideas, and provide peer review for their  work.

Despite its closed nature (limited to 30 members as proposed by James Mill), the Political Economy Club was a domineering influence in 19th C. economics.  But its exclusivity prevented it from becoming a wider association for economists. That role was filled by Section F of the BAAS (founded1832), the Statistical Society of London (f.1834), the Cobden Club (f.1866) and finally the British Economic Association (f.1890).

History
The club was founded in 1821 and supported free trade. On 18 April 1821, Swinton Holand held the first meeting at his house. A second larger meeting was held at Freemasons' Tavern, London on 30 April.

The club now meets on a monthly basis in Brooks's to hear papers presented by members of the club and a discussion over dinner.

Discussions 

The participants soon found substantial difficulties in formulating and reaching agreement on their fundamental propositions.  Ricardo felt that none of their views was safe from criticism.  Reflecting on their theoretical discussions in 1823, Ricardo privately expressed his famous opinion about the "non-existence of any measure of absolute value."

Members

Notable members include: 
David Ricardo, Thomas Malthus, James Mill, Colonel Thomas Moody, Kt., Robert Torrens, Thomas Tooke, John Stuart Mill, John Ramsey McCulloch, Nassau Senior, John Elliott Cairnes, Henry Fawcett, William Newmarch, Samuel Jones-Loyd, 1st Baron Overstone, Jane Marcet, George Warde Norman, William Blake, Walter Coulson, George Pryme, George R. Porter, William T. Thornton, Walter Bagehot, and Jean-Baptiste Say.

Later: William Stanley Jevons, Thomas Edward Cliffe Leslie, Walter Coulson, Robert Mushet, Henry Parnell, James Pennington, John Horsley Palmer, and Thomas Perronet Thompson. Others were drawn from outside the ranks of economists, including G. G. de Larpent, George John Shaw-Lefevre, John Abel Smith, Henry Warburton, Lord Althorp, William Whitmore, W. B. Baring, Poulett Thomson, Sir Robert Wilmot-Horton, Lord Monteagle, Charles Hay Cameron, James Deacon Hume, George Grote, James Morrison, Edwin Chadwick, Sir Robert Giffen, Charles Buller, and Sir William Clay.

Significant elections after 1840 include Robert Lowe, Sir G. C. Lewis, Rowland Hill, Stafford Northcote, George J. Goschen, William Ewart Gladstone, and W. E. Forster.

Current members include

Honorary members ex officio: (limited to six from the following list)

The 19 founding members of the Political Economy Club (1821)

Bicentenary Essay Competition 
To celebrate the PEC's bicentennial, an open international essay competition was announced in 2020 for the 2021 year. Candidates were asked to choose one of two titles. These were:

 "How relevant are the ideas of Malthus and Ricardo respectively to today’s issues of climate change (is this an example of Malthusian limits?) and of limits to markets (is globalisation with free trade and free capital movements an unmixed blessing?)?"
 "With UK real income per head up 15 times over the past 200 years and more evenly distributed, will this be repeated over the next 200 years? – and if not, why not?"

See also
 American Economic Association

References

Archives
 Political Economy Club papers at the Archives Division of the London School of Economics.

Publications
 J. R. McCulloch, Early English Tracts on Commerce.  London: Political Economy Club (1856); Cambridge University Press, 1954.
 Political Economy Club, Revised Report of the Proceedings at the Dinner of 31 May 1876, Held in Celebration of the Hundredth Year of the Publication of the “Wealth of Nations” London: Longmans, Green, Reader & Dyer (1876).
 Political Economy Club : founded in London, 1821 : minutes of proceedings, 1899–1920, roll of members and questions discussed, 1821–1920 with documents bearing on the history of the club.       	Macmillan and Co., (1921)

Classical economics
Economic thought
Economic history of the United Kingdom
Political economy
1821 establishments in the United Kingdom
Think tanks based in the United Kingdom